Essie Coffey , born Essieina Shillingsworth, (1941–1998) was born near Goodooga in northern New South Wales, Australia.  She was a Muruwari woman and the co-founder of the Western Aboriginal Legal Service and served on a number of government bodies and Aboriginal community organisations.

Her family avoided forced relocation to an Aboriginal reserve by following seasonal rural work.

Coffey co-founded the Western Aboriginal Legal Service and the Aboriginal Heritage and Cultural Museum in Brewarrina, serving on several government bodies and Aboriginal community organisations including the Aboriginal Lands Trust and the Aboriginal Advisory Council. She was an inaugural member of the Council for Aboriginal Reconciliation.

She was awarded a Medal of the Order of Australia (OAM) on 10 June 1985, for service to the Aboriginal community. She was nominated for an MBE but refused it, explaining "I knocked the MBE back because I'm not a member of the British Empire".

Coffey was also an active filmmaker. In 1978 she made My Survival as an Aboriginal, which she gave to Queen Elizabeth II as a gift at the opening of Australia's new Parliament House in 1988. The film won the Greater Union Award for documentary film and the Rouben Mamoulian Award at the Sydney Film Festival 1979.  The sequel, My Life As I Live It, was released in 1993. Coffey also appeared in the film Backroads.

Essie Coffey and her husband, Albert "Doc" Coffey, raised 8 children and adopted 10 more.

References

External links
 
 
 

1941 births
1998 deaths
Australian indigenous rights activists
Women human rights activists
Recipients of the Medal of the Order of Australia
People from New South Wales
Australian women activists